730 AM is a Mexican and Canadian clear-channel frequency. XEX Mexico City and CKAC Montreal are the Class A stations on 730 kHz.  The following radio stations broadcast on AM frequency 730 kHz:

Argentina
 Radio Concepto in Buenos Aires.
 LRA3 in Santa Rosa, La Pampa.
 BBN in Buenos Aires. 
 LRA27 Nacional in San Fernando del Valle de Catamarca, Catamarca
 LU23 Lago Argentino in El Calafate, Santa Cruz.

Canada
Stations in bold are clear-channel stations.

Colombia
HJCU at Bogota

Guatemala (Channel 20)
TGN in Guatemala City

Mexico
Stations in bold are clear-channel stations.
 XELBC-AM in Loreto, Baja California Sur
 XEPET-AM in Peto, Yucatán
 XESOS-AM in El Sifón, Sonora
 XEX-AM in Mexico City - 60 kW daytime, 100 kW nighttime transmitter located at

United States

References

Lists of radio stations by frequency